Malibu Hydro System was designed to provide electricity to the Malibu Club in Canada. The flow of water turns a pelton wheel which is attached to a generator to create electricity. The electricity is then transmitted to camp by a submarine cable running under Jervis Inlet at a high voltage to reduce losses. Power is then distributed throughout camp on the existing and upgraded electrical system.

Sources 
The hydro turbine is feed by a yearlong creek called McCannel Creek, which is directly across Jervis Inlet from Malibu. At the outlet of the lake, a dam was built to maintain the lake level and control the flow of the creek.

Weir (Item A) 
A small weir type dam was built at the lake outlet, and, by limiting the discharge into the creek, aids in maintaining the lake level. The weir has a large pipe and valve in its base to pass the minimum  required to maintain the creek. This is in addition to the water which will be spilled to create power.

Intake (Item B) 
Water regulated at the lake will flow down the creek from the  level to the  level.

Power House (Item C & D) 
The power house contains the turbine, generator, and the necessary equipment to control and distribute the electricity for Malibu. It is located a short distance above the beach. The following diagram and table explains what happens once the water flow reaches the Power house (read the diagram right to left)

Power Line (Item E) 
Transformers at the hydro generator raise 600 volts to 15,000 volts for transmission. On the Malibu side of the inlet, a transformer steps the 15,000 volts down to 120 and 208 volts for use at the camp.

History
It began installation in 2005.

References

Hydroelectric power stations in British Columbia
Turbines
Appropriate technology
Renewable energy in Canada